Abduahi Bala Lau, popularly known as Sheikh Balalau, is a Nigerian Islamic scholar, cleric, mufassir, and preacher. He is the national Chairman of the Jama'atu Izalatul Bidi'ah wa Ikamatus Sunnah, the largest Salafi movement in Nigeria since December 2011.

Life
Balalau was born and raised in Taraba State. In 2020 one of Nigeria's magazines stated that the Izala leader is dead.

Career
Bala Lau Member Board of Trustees and Central Working Committee
Bala Lau is the National Chairman Jama’atul Izalatul Bid’ah Wa Iqamatul Sunnah (JIBWIS) Nigeria. He became the Public Relations Officer (P.R.O) of the organization, at age of 19, in his home state of Taraba. He was appointed chief Imam of Daubeli Juma’ah mosque of Yola North. Following this, he became a member of JIBWIS National Executive Committee, National Preaching Class and Chairman Launching Committee. Bala Lau became the Deputy National Chairman after the death of Sheikh Abubakar Ikara.

References

Living people
Hausa people
People from Taraba State
1964 births